William Milne (23 March 1852 – 16 March 1923) was a British sport shooter who competed at the 1908 Summer Olympics and the 1912 Summer Olympics.

In the 1908 Summer Olympics he participated in the following events:

 disappearing target small-bore rifle - fourth place
 moving target small-bore rifle - seventh place
 stationary target small-bore rifle - 14th place

Four years later in 1912 he won the silver medal in the 50 metre rifle, prone as well as with the British team in the team 25 metre small-bore rifle competition. In the individual 25 metre small-bore rifle event he finished 22nd.

He had an illustrious Army career, serving with the 92nd Gordon Highlanders in India, Afghanistan and South Africa. In 1902 he was selected to fill a vacancy in the King's Bodyguard of the Yeomen of the Guard. Apart from this appointment, he had retired from the Army and became Steward of the London Scottish Golf Club.

His family comprised sons James, Douglas, and Gordon, and daughters Annie and Doris. He was survived by his wife Mary.

References

External links
profile

1852 births
1923 deaths
British male sport shooters
ISSF rifle shooters
Olympic shooters of Great Britain
Shooters at the 1908 Summer Olympics
Shooters at the 1912 Summer Olympics
Olympic silver medallists for Great Britain
Olympic medalists in shooting
Medalists at the 1912 Summer Olympics